Béla Károlyi (born September 13, 1942) is an ethnic Hungarian Romanian-American gymnastics coach. Early in his coaching career he developed the Romanian centralised training system for gymnastics. One of his earliest protégés was Nadia Comăneci, the first Olympic Games gymnast to be awarded a perfect score. Living under the dictatorship of Nicolae Ceaușescu, Károlyi frequently clashed with Romanian officials. He and his wife defected to the United States in 1981.

Since their arrival in the United States, Béla and his wife Márta Károlyi have been credited with transforming the coaching of gymnastics in the US and bringing major international success. They have both been head coach of the United States women's national gymnastics team, as well as national team coordinator for United States gymnastics at the Olympic Games. They have also been severely criticized for their coaching style, which many gymnasts have called abusive. They have said they had no clue that Larry Nassar, the national gymnastics team doctor who was convicted of sexual assault of minors, was assaulting young female gymnasts in their care at their Karolyi Ranch training facility in Texas. The Karolyis and their ranch are central figures in 2020 film, Athlete A - a documentary about the scandal.

Károlyi has coached many notable national, European, World and Olympic gymnasts, including Nadia Comăneci, Ecaterina Szabo, Mary Lou Retton, Betty Okino, Teodora Ungureanu, Kim Zmeskal, Kristie Phillips, Dominique Moceanu, Phoebe Mills, and Kerri Strug. In total, Károlyi has coached nine Olympic champions, fifteen world champions, sixteen European medalists, and six U.S. national champions. Béla Károlyi was inducted into the International Gymnastics Hall of Fame in 1997. Béla and Márta Károlyi as a coaching team were inducted into the US Gymnastics Hall of Fame in 2000.

Early coaching career

Károlyi was born in Kolozsvár, Hungary (now Cluj-Napoca, Romania). Skilled as an athlete, he became a national junior boxing champion and a member of the Romanian hammer throwing team. He enrolled at the Romania College of Physical Education, studying and practicing gymnastics after having had trouble with a mandatory skills test in the sport.

In his senior year at the college, Károlyi coached the women's gymnastics team, whose star was Márta Erőss. They later started a relationship and married in 1963. They moved to a small town in the coal-mining region where Béla had grown up, where they started a gymnastics class in the elementary school. Later they were invited by the government to create a national school for gymnastics.

Romania's famed centralized training program has its roots in the 1950s; Károlyi helped develop the program further in the late 1960s and early 1970s. He worked as a coach at the boarding school in Gheorghe Gheorghiu-Dej (now named Oneşti), training young girls specially chosen for their athletic potential. One of the first students at the school was six-year-old Nadia Comăneci, who lived near the town and commuted from home.

Károlyi debuted as an international coach in 1974. He had to persuade the Romanian gymnastics federation to have Comăneci and his other athletes named to the 1975 European Championships and the 1976 Olympic team, because the federation favored athletes from the competing Dinamo club in Bucharest. At the 1976 Summer Olympics in Montreal, he was head coach of the Romanian squad, and most of the members of the team were Gheorghe Gheorghiu-Dej athletes. The team took the silver medal, and Comăneci was one of the outstanding performers of the Games, scoring the first-ever perfect 10 in Olympic competition. Altogether, the Romanians won seven medals in Montreal: three gold, two silver, and two bronze.

After Comăneci's astounding success in Montreal, Károlyi's importance as a coach was recognized. He was named head coach of the Romanian team at the 1980 Olympics. However, he came under fire from Romanian officials because of his score protests at several international meets, including the 1980 Olympics.

Defecting to the United States 
After the Olympics, Károlyi again clashed with Romanian Federation officials, and tension escalated. During a 1981 gymnastics tour, Romanian team choreographer Géza Pozsár and the Károlyis defected and sought political asylum in the United States, temporarily leaving their seven-year-old daughter Andrea with relatives in Romania. They settled in Texas.

1980s
In 1981, a group of businessmen invited Károlyi to join a gymnastics business venture. He decided to invest in the business, and the Károlyis relocated to Houston. The gym ran into financial problems, and Károlyi ended up buying it.

Károlyi's status as "Nadia's coach" quickly attracted gymnasts to his club. Three years after his defection, he attended the 1984 Olympics as the individual coach of Mary Lou Retton, who won all-around champion, and Julianne McNamara, who won the gold medal for uneven bars. Olympic rules at that time did not permit a gymnast's personal coach to be present on the competition floor. Only the national coach Don Peters and his assistant were allowed on the floor. Károlyi obtained a maintenance man's pass so he could be near Retton and McNamara during the competition.  ABC television network commented on this controversy during its broadcasts and often showed Mary Lou Retton and Julianne McNamara running over to the stands to speak to Károlyi. During the 1984 Olympics, Károlyi did not have an official position with the delegation. He slept in his car, and ignored Peters' instructions by holding supplementary workouts for his gymnasts. Károlyi's clout in the United States increased after the victories of his students in 1984, but so did resentment against him. After Retton's success in 1984, Károlyi purchased the Karolyi Ranch. He was paid by McDonald's to have their golden arch logo as part of his sleeve design. His new gym, run from the ranch, attracted many of the country's top gymnasts.

Following the 1984 Olympics, USGF decided to replace Peters with Greg Marsden as Olympic coach. Marsden was a college coach with no private students and no financial interest in promoting one gymnast at the expense of another. Marsden said that he "thought some of the concerns the other coaches had about Károlyi were legitimate," and selected Donna Cozzo as assistant national coach. Károlyi was furious and had to be dissuaded from boycotting the 1987 Pan American Games. Károlyi did not attend the meet, complaining that he was not allowed to coach although he was "providing fifty percent of the team". Károlyi's star gymnast Kristie Phillips competed in the meet, finishing second behind Sabrina Mar, who trained with  former Olympic coach Don Peters at SCATS gym.

The United States did not do well in the 1987 World Championships, finishing 6th. Marsden resigned from his position as national team coach in November 1987.

After Marsden resigned, Károlyi lobbied to be appointed as national coach, but he was opposed by the other coaches. Don Peters was restored to the position in January 1988. Peters chose Béla's wife Márta Károlyi to serve as assistant national coach. Károlyi told USGF that he would not attend the 1988 Seoul Olympic Games, unless he was the team coach.

At the 1988 Olympic Trials in August, Károlyi's gymnasts earned 5 of the top 8 spots. These five gymnasts were Phoebe Mills, Brandy Johnson, Chelle Stack, and the two team alternates Rhonda Faehn and Kristie Phillips. Phillips, who had left Károlyi's gym and trained with Peters for a short time following her disappointing performance at the 1987 World Championships, said that Peters workouts were "not half as intense (as Károlyi's)". Phillips told reporters it would hurt the national team if they had to leave Károlyi's gym and train with Peters at SCATS. USGF executive director Mike Jacki said, "The women's coaches are all private businessmen. ... The more kids you put on the team, the better it is for your business."

Peters resigned as national coach after the trials. Following Peters' resignation, the USGF decided against having a national team coach. They decided to allow personal coaches to accompany the gymnasts to the competition. The U.S. Olympic team finished fourth in Seoul. East German gymnastic official Ellen Berger raised a valid objection, since a U.S. team member had violated one of the obscure competition rules. After the springboard had been used at the start of another gymnast's uneven bars routine, the U.S. alternate, Rhonda Faehn, had pulled it away, but had stayed on the podium to watch, instead of stepping off again immediately, as required by the rule. Had Faehn stepped off the podium, the US team would have won the bronze medal. Because of this small points deduction, the East German team overtook the American team and won the bronze medal. An incensed Karolyi said the rule was invoked in order to "keep the scores down" because the East German team was "fighting desperately to keep their place". The obscure rule cited more that no assistance can be given during a performance. It did not specifically mention athletes on the podium. A jury dominated by Soviet Bloc officials voted to maintain the deduction. Despite the fact that the U.S. team had indeed committed an infraction, he said that application of the scoring penalty was "dirty cheating". A photograph of Karolyi embracing and consoling the disappointed American girls appeared in most U.S. newspapers the following day.

After the 1988 Olympics, Károlyi's sphere of influence continued to grow, as did the number of elite gymnasts training in his gym. At one meet in 1990, a journalist dubbed six top Károlyi gymnasts the "Karolyi six-pack." Although the members of the six-pack would change, the name stuck and increased Károlyi's prominence in the sport.

1990s
At the 1991 World Championships, four of the six athletes on the U.S. women's team—Kim Zmeskal, Betty Okino, Hilary Grivich, and Kerri Strug—were trained by Károlyi; the other two, Shannon Miller and Michelle Campi, were trained by ex-Károlyi club coaches. The situation was almost repeated at the 1992 Olympics, where Károlyi was head coach and five members of the seven-gymnast squad (six competitors and one alternate) were either trained by him or one of his protégés.

Károlyi primarily served as a personal coach for Dominique Moceanu and Kerri Strug at the 1996 Olympics, but he still managed to draw the spotlight. His motivational speech to Strug after she injured her ankle on her first vault ("Shake it off! You can do it!") was broadcast on television and was widely viewed. After Strug's successful final vault, Károlyi carried her to the podium to accept her gold medal. The moment was photographed and widely publicized.

Károlyi retired from coaching after the 1996 Olympics. He and Márta still have a ranch and gymnastics camp in New Waverly, Texas. In 1997, Károlyi was inducted into the International Gymnastics Hall of Fame.

1999–2000 
Following the success of the U.S. team, dubbed the "Magnificent Seven," at the 1996 Olympics, USA Gymnastics experienced a lull. A new requirement that competitors be at least 16 years old in the calendar year of the competition (up from the previous 15) kept some top gymnasts out of the World Championships in 1997. While American gymnasts did win medals in international competitions such as the Goodwill Games and the Pacific Alliance Championships, they were largely unsuccessful in most major meets. In both 1997 and 1999, the American team left the World Championships without a single medal.

After the 1999 World Championships, USA Gymnastics tried to revamp its program by hiring Károlyi as national team coordinator. Károlyi required that all national team members attend frequent, grueling camps at his ranch north of Houston. Some observers believed that selection procedures for international meets became more arbitrary. Coaches resented what they felt was Károlyi's intrusion onto their domain, and athletes were under a considerable amount of stress. The tension had escalated to the point where gymnasts were openly speaking out against Károlyi. At the 2000 Olympics, the U.S. originally placed fourth, but the Chinese team had an underage athlete, so the U.S. team was awarded the bronze.

In 2001, Marta Károlyi was selected for the national team coordinator position. While she retained some aspects of her husband's program, such as the training camp system, she reduced the frequency of the camps. Her different approach met with more acceptance by both coaches and gymnasts. Between 2001 and 2007, American women won a combined total of 34 medals in World Championship and Olympic competition. Between 2001 and 2016, they won five World Championships team titles (2003, 2007, 2011, 2014, and 2015) and two Olympic team titles (2012, 2016). Additionally, the team won four consecutive Olympic all-arounds (2004, 2008, 2012, and 2016), Eight World Championships all-arounds (2005, 2007, 2009, 2011, 2013, 2014, 2015, and 2017), and eighteen individual event World Championships titles.

Later career
Márta Károlyi remained the national team coordinator for USA Gymnastics until 2016. During the 2008 Summer Olympics, Béla Károlyi appeared as a guest commentator for NBC News. He claimed that the Chinese women's gymnastics team was cheating by using athletes who did not meet the minimum age requirement. He and his wife said, "They are using half-people. One of the biggest frustrations is, what arrogance. These people think we are stupid."

Károlyi said that he disagreed with the age limit, and called for the International Olympic Committee to abolish it. He said that if a gymnast was good enough to earn a spot at the Olympics or World Championships, he or she deserves to go. He praised the Chinese for their competitiveness and skills during the competitions, and said that he objected to the possibility that they were being used by their government. "They do good gymnastics and are a good service for the sport," he said. "They have the ultimate effective training program. That’s why I am more upset that they are cheating. They don’t need cheating. They would be just as good with a lineup of eligible athletes."

Controversy
Several of Károlyi's athletes from the "six-pack" era have criticized his training methods. Some of his former athletes, including Kristie Phillips, Dominique Moceanu, and Erica Stokes, have stated publicly that Károlyi was verbally and psychologically abusive during workouts. Károlyi's constant critical remarks about weight and body type were said to drive some gymnasts to develop eating disorders and low self-esteem. Some gymnasts, such as Phillips, Moceanu, and 1988 Olympian Chelle Stack, have also said they were compelled to continue training and competing even when coping with serious injuries such as broken bones. In one interview, Moceanu, who was one of Károlyi's final protégés, said: "I'm sure Béla saw injuries, but if you were injured, Béla didn't want to see it. ... You had to deal with it. I was intimidated. He looked down on me. He was six-feet something, and I was four-foot nothing."

Károlyi was also said to strictly monitor his gymnasts' food intake: Moceanu, for instance, stated that at meets away from home, gymnasts were limited to consuming as few as 900 Calories a day. Even Károlyi's supporters have admitted that at certain competitions, his gymnasts ate so sparingly that members of the men's gymnastics team smuggled food to them in their hotel rooms.

However, many of Károlyi's most prominent gymnasts have vehemently defended him against these allegations. Nadia Comăneci, in her 2004 memoir Letters to a Young Gymnast, remarked that she literally trusted Károlyi with her life. She also stated that in Romania, the gymnasts at Károlyi's school consumed well-balanced diets and, in fact, ate better than most other civilians in the country at the time. Olympic medalists and Károlyi gymnasts Mary Lou Retton, Phoebe Mills and Kim Zmeskal, among others, have also praised Károlyi and his training regimen.

A number of former Károlyi gymnasts, both supporters and detractors, have acknowledged that some of the allegations about Károlyi were true, but have also claimed that the ends—medals—justified the means. In Joan Ryan's 1995 Little Girls in Pretty Boxes, 1992 Olympian Betty Okino said: "What Béla did worked. He motivated me by getting me mad." Some have claimed that Károlyi stopped treating gymnasts harshly when parents directly requested that he do so. In a column she wrote rebutting many of the claims of Little Girls in Pretty Boxes, Okino wrote: "Károlyi structured his training in a way that built your physical and mental strength to such a remarkable level that even he couldn't tear you down. Béla wanted to know that when push came to shove, his athletes could handle any situation thrown at them."

In an interview in the edition of December 8, 2007 of the Romanian newspaper Evenimentul Zilei, Adrian Goreac,  the coach of the Romanian national gymnastics team from 1981 to 1990, after Károlyi left, spoke of Károlyi's "dictatorial regime" during his time coaching the Romanian gymnastics team.

In November 2008, Emilia Eberle, a Romanian national team member during the Károlyi coaching era, gave an interview to KCRA-TV in Sacramento, California, claiming that while she was on the national team, both Béla and Márta Károlyi regularly beat her and her teammates for mistakes they made in practice or competition. "In one word, I can say it was brutal", she told KCRA. Other Romanian team members, including Ecaterina Szabo and Rodica Dunca, as well as Géza Pozsár, the team choreographer who defected with the Károlyis, have made similar charges of physical abuse. When asked in 2008 to comment on the allegations, Béla said: "I ignore it. I'm not even commenting. These people are really trash."

Role in sexual abuse scandal
While Károlyi has not been personally implicated in the USA Gymnastics sex abuse scandal that was reported beginning in 2016, gymnasts said that many instances of sexual abuse perpetrated by former team doctor Larry Nassar occurred at the Karolyi Ranch. Nassar reportedly groomed athletes for abuse and gained their trust in part by covertly providing them with food in defiance of Károlyi's strict dietary guidelines. Some gymnasts also said that the strict discipline and conditions at the ranch made them feel inhibited from reporting Nassar's abuses. As a result of the scandal, in July 2017 USA Gymnastics cancelled its plans to buy Karolyi Ranch. In January 2018 USA Gymnastics announced they were cutting ties with Karolyi Ranch altogether.

Books

Television
Béla Károlyi was in the episode "At the Edge of the Worlds", in the ABC Family show Make It or Break It. He portrayed Coach Sasha Belov's father.

References

Further reading

External links

Béla Karolyi's bio at USA Gymnastics
Image of Karolyi carrying Kerri Strug
"Bela Karolyi: World Renowned Gymnastics Coach", Shade Global, New York, NY (PDF version)

1942 births
Living people
Sportspeople from Cluj-Napoca
American gymnastics coaches
American Olympic coaches
Romanian gymnastics coaches
Romanian emigrants to the United States
Romanian sportspeople of Hungarian descent
American people of Hungarian-Romanian descent
Romanian defectors
Defectors to the United States
Naturalized citizens of the United States